Ștefan Minovici (July 18, 1867 – December 29, 1935) was a Romanian chemist.

The brother of Mina Minovici and Nicolae Minovici, he became a corresponding member of the Romanian Academy in 1925.

Education
Minovici was born in Râmnicu Sărat into a family of Aromanian origin. 
After studying at the gymnasium in Brăila from 1875 to 1882, he moved to Bucharest, where he completed his high school studies at Saint Sava National College in 1887. He then enrolled in the Faculty of Sciences at the University of Bucharest, majoring in physics and chemistry, and received a B.S. in 1893. The year after he went to study at Friedrich Wilhelm University in Berlin under Emil Fischer, graduating in 1897.

Career
In 1899 Minovici joined the faculty at the Faculty of Medicine and Pharmacy in Bucharest. In 1912 he was promoted to full professor at the University of Bucharest, while in 1925 he became director of the Institute of Organic Chemistry at the university. At that time he founded the Society of Chemistry in Romania, which became the official body representing Romania within the Paris-based International Union of Pure and Applied Chemistry.

Minovici died suddenly on December 29, 1935, in Pitești of a cerebral hemorrhage.

Publications

Notes

1867 births
1935 deaths
People from Râmnicu Sărat
Romanian chemists
Members of the Romanian Academy of Sciences
Saint Sava National College alumni
University of Bucharest alumni
Humboldt University of Berlin alumni
Academic staff of the Carol Davila University of Medicine and Pharmacy
Academic staff of the University of Bucharest
Romanian people of Aromanian descent